Candied almonds are nuts (usually almonds) that have been cooked in a special way, so they end up coated in browned, crunchy sugar.  Candied almonds are cooked by heating brown sugar or white sugar, cinnamon and water in a pan then dipping the almonds in the sugar mixture. They are a typical open air fair snack in Italy where in the Tuscany they are called Addormentasuocere but also common in other regions with different names. In Spain they are called "Garrapiñadas". In Switzerland and Germany they are called "Gebrannte Mandeln". They are also fairly common in Denmark, Norway and Sweden, being frequently sold at Christmas markets, where they are similarly known as "brændte mandler", "brente mandler" and "brända mandlar" respectively.

References

Snack foods
Spanish cuisine
Almond desserts
Nut confections